Hiddat is a 2017 Pakistani television romantic drama serial aired on GEO TV, written by Samra Bukhari. Directed by Ahmed Kamran, it was produced by Abdullah Kadwani and Asad Qureshi under the 7th Sky Entertainment banner. The serial stars Arij Fatyma, Adeel Chaudhry, Farhan Malhi and Seemi Pasha.

Synopsis 
A romantic-at-heart Nimra (Arij Fatyma) has a carefree home life. Her engagement to Adnan (Adeel Chaudhry) however feels like an end to all exciting possibilities, until she meets the free-spirited Farhad (Farhan Mali).

With a wild attempt to escape from the shackles of her home, Nimra runs away from home to live with Farhad. Adnan ties the knot with Nimra's younger sister Aqsa to take revenge from ex-fiancé.

Unfortunately, Nimra is met with rejection from Farhad's family. Her impulsive decision leaves her at the mercy of her sister-in-law, Aqeela's widower Uncle's place.

Will Nimra ever find her way back to peace? Or will one reckless decision shape her entire destiny?

Cast 

 Arij Fatyma As Nimra
 Adeel Chaudhry As Adnan
 Saniya Shamshad As Aqsa
 Farhan Ahmed Malhi As Farhad
 Anum Tanveer As Aqeela
 Seemi Pasha As Azra
 Mariya Khan As Asma
 Faryal Mehmood As Seema
 Rashid Farooqui As Shabbir
 Saleem Mairaj As Qurban
 Humaira Zaheer As Kulsoom
 Taifoor As Saad
 Birjees Farooqui As Farhad's mother

Soundtrack 
The original soundtrack of "Hiddat" is composed and sung by Faakhir Mehmood and Rose Merry. The lyrics are penned down by S.K Khalish.

References

External links 
Hiddat on Amazon Prime

2017 Pakistani television series debuts
2017 Pakistani television series endings
Geo TV original programming
Pakistani drama television series
Urdu-language television shows